Sombrio Beach is a beach in Capital Regional District, British Columbia, Canada, southeast of the settlement of Port Renfrew. It is on the southwest coast of Vancouver Island on the Strait of Juan de Fuca, west of Sombrio Point, and astride the mouth of the Sombrio River. The beach is partly within Juan de Fuca Provincial Park and is traversed by the Juan de Fuca Marine Trail.

Recreation
The beach can be accessed from British Columbia Highway 14 via the Sombrio Beach Trailhead, where there are parking and restroom facilities. There are three cutoff points to the beach from the Juan de Fuca Marine Trail: Sombrio Beach (East) at kilometre 28.0; Sombrio Beach (West) at kilometre 29.6; and Sombrio Beach (West-west) at kilometre 30.2. There is a camping site at East Sombrio Beach with restroom facilities.

See also
China Beach (Canada)
Jordan River, British Columbia

References

Beaches of British Columbia
Juan de Fuca region
Surfing locations in Canada